Canton Lutheran Church is a historic church at 124 E. Second Street in Canton, South Dakota. It was built in 1908 and was added to the National Register in 2002.

The Canton Lutheran congregation worship services were first held in 1868 in homes of Norwegian immigrant homesteaders. A second Norwegian Lutheran congregation was later established in Canton. In 1902, the two congregations merged and joined their two wooden churches together to form one large auditorium. The present church was erected In 1908–09. The office-library-chapel-Sunday school addition was built in 1962.

References

External links
Canton Lutheran Church website

Lutheran churches in South Dakota
Churches on the National Register of Historic Places in South Dakota
Gothic Revival church buildings in South Dakota
Churches completed in 1908
Buildings and structures in Lincoln County, South Dakota
National Register of Historic Places in Lincoln County, South Dakota
1868 establishments in Dakota Territory